Radulov (Russian and Bulgarian: Радулов) is a Russian and Bulgarian masculine surname derived from the male given name Radul, its feminine counterpart is Radulova. It may refer to:

 Alexander Radulov (born 1986), Russian hockey player
 Igor Radulov (born 1982), Russian hockey player
 Ivan Radulov (born 1939), Bulgarian chess player
 Semen Radulov (born 1989), Ukrainian freestyle wrestler
 Troyan Radulov (born 1974), Bulgarian footballer

See also
Radulović, Serbian variant

Bulgarian-language surnames
Russian-language surnames